Lupoid sycosis is a cutaneous condition that is characterized by a scarring form of deep folliculitis, typically affecting the beard area.

See also 
 Sycosis barbae
 List of cutaneous conditions

References 

Bacterium-related cutaneous conditions